Act My Age may refer to:

"Act My Age", a song by Hoodie Allen from People Keep Talking
"Act My Age", a song by One Direction from Four
"Act My Age", a song by Madchild from Switched On
"Act My Age", a song by Katy Perry from Witness

See also
At My Age
Act Your Age (disambiguation)